Vaganicë is a village in the municipality of Mitrovicë municipality, Kosovo.

Notes

References

Villages in Mitrovica, Kosovo